Delevan Baptist Church, also known as First Baptist Church and First Colored Baptist Church, is a historic African-American Baptist church building located at 632 W. Main Street in Charlottesville, Virginia. It was built in 1883, and is a one-story, three bay by six bay, Victorian Romanesque style brick church.  It sits on a raised basement and features with a square projecting central tower topped by a large octagonal lantern on a square base, both of wood.

It was added to the National Register of Historic Places in 1982.  It is located in the Fifeville and Tonsler Neighborhoods Historic District.

References

External links
MarkerHistory.com: First Baptist Church West Main Street Marker, Q-16

African-American history of Virginia
Baptist churches in Virginia
Churches completed in 1883
Churches on the National Register of Historic Places in Virginia
Churches in Charlottesville, Virginia
National Register of Historic Places in Charlottesville, Virginia
Historic district contributing properties in Virginia